Now That I Know

"Now That I Know", Aria Tesolin
"Now That I Know", Shannon McNally]  2002
"Now That I Know", Ashley Monroe
"Now That I Know", SremmLife 2
"Now That I Know", Music Box (Mariah Carey album)